Honey Creek is a stream in Tayler County (Iowa) and Nodaway County (Missouri) in the United States. It is a tributary of Platte River.

Honey Creek was so named on account of honeybees near its course.

See also
List of rivers of Iowa
List of rivers of Missouri

References

Rivers of Nodaway County, Missouri
Rivers of Taylor County, Iowa
Rivers of Iowa
Rivers of Missouri